Baryancistrus chrysolomus is a species of catfish in the family Loricariidae. It is native to South America, where it occurs in the Xingu River basin in Brazil. Adults of the species are most frequently found under flat rocks on the river bottom in places with fine sediments, whereas juveniles are found under rocks in marginal areas near river banks. The species reaches 29.6 cm (11.7 inches) in total length and feeds on the diatoms and invertebrate larvae associated with fine sediments such as sand. It is present in the aquarium trade, where it is referred to as the mango pleco or by its L-number, L-047.

References 

Ancistrini
Fish described in 2011
Freshwater fish of South America